Modern scientific research on the history of Zen discerns three main narratives concerning Zen, its history and its teachings: Traditional Zen Narrative (TZN), Buddhist Modernism (BM), Historical and Cultural Criticism (HCC). An external narrative is Nondualism, which claims Zen to be a token of a universal nondualist essence of religions.

Traditional Zen Narrative (TZN)
The Traditional Zen Narrative developed in phases in China during the Tang dynasty and the beginning of the Song dynasty, from the 7th to 11th century. It became dominant during the Song dynasty, when Chán was the dominant form of Buddhism in China, due to support from the Imperial Court.

Its main phases were the development of the traditional Chan lineage, culminating in the "Transmission of the Lamp"-genre, the encounter dialogue culminating in the kōan collections, and the "climax-paradigm of the Song period", when Chan became the dominant Buddhist school in China.

The Traditional Zen Narrative bases its self-understanding especially on the encounter stories of the well-known teachers of the later Tang-period, such as Mazu Daoyi and Linji Yixuan. This period is seen as the "golden age" of Chan, a "romantic coloring" discarded by McRae:

Buddhist Modernism (BM)

In the 20th century the Traditional Zen Narrative was transformed into a modern narrative, due to the power of the Western colonial forces and the modernisation of Japan, and the popularization in the Western world.

Romanticism and transcendentalism

As a consequence of the adaptation of Zen to the modern world, and the cross-cultural fertilization of western transcendentalism and esotery and Japanese Zen, a romantic idea of enlightenment as insight into a timeless, transcendent reality has been popularized. This is especially due to the influence of Soyen Shaku and his student D.T. Suzuki, who, though known as a Zen Buddhist, was also influenced by Theosophy. Further popularization was due to the writings of Heinrich Dumoulin. Dumoulin viewed metaphysics as the expression of a transcendent truth, which according to him was expressed by Mahayana Buddhism, but not by the pragmatic analysis of the oldest Buddhism, which emphasizes anatta. This romantic vision fits into Western romantic notions of self-realization and the true self, being regarded as a substantial essence being covered over by social conditioning:

The Traditional Zen Narrative attracted the interest of Beat poets and writers in the 1950s:

Historical and Cultural Criticism (HCC)

Contemporary research on Buddhism has shed new light on the history of Chan and Zen.

Since the 1960s the scientific research on Zen has created another narrative of Zen. The "grand saga" of Zen appears not to be an accurate historical documentation, but a skillfully created narrative, meant to lend authority to the Zen school. The consequences of this critical narrative seem hardly to be recognized in the Western world.

Enlightenment as timeless transcendence
The romantic notion of enlightenment as a timeless insight into a transcendental essence has been thoroughly criticized. According to critics it doesn't contribute to a real insight into Buddhism:

Further reading
Classic historiography
 Dumoulin, Heinrich (2005), Zen Buddhism: A History. Volume 1: India and China. World Wisdom Books. 
 Dumoulin, Heinrich (2005), Zen Buddhism: A History. Volume 2: Japan. World Wisdom Books. 

Critical historiography
Overview

Formation of Chán in Tang & Song China
 Mcrae, John (2003), Seeing through Zen. Encounter, Transformation, and Genealogy in Chinese Chan Buddhism. The University Press Group Ltd. 

Japan

Modern times

 McMahan, David L. (2008), The Making of Buddhist Modernism. Oxford University Press.

External links

 thezensite
 Zen Buddhism WWW Virtual Library
 Chart of (Asian) Zen schools
 Sweeping Zen: Who's who in Zen
 Glossary of Japanese Zen terms

Zen